Spirostreptidae is a family of millipedes in the order Spirostreptida. It contains around 100 genera distributed in North and South America, the eastern Mediterranean, continental Africa, Madagascar, and Seychelles. It contains the following genera:

Aethiopistreptus
Alloporus
Alogostreptus
Anastreptus
Andineptus
Anethoporus
Archispirostreptus
Attemsostreptus
Aulonopygus
Autostreptus
Bicoxidens
Brasilostreptus
Brevitibius
Bucinogonus
Caicarostreptus
Calathostreptus
Calostreptus
Camaricoproctus
Cearostreptus
Chamberlineptus
Charactopygus
Cladodeptus
Cladostreptus
Cochleostreptus
Cochliogonus
Collostreptus
Conchostreptus
Demangeptus
Diaporus
Dicyclostreptus
Eiphorus
Ellateptus
Epistreptus
Eumekius
Exallostreptus
Exospermastix
Exospermitius
Furcillogonus
Globanus
Gonepityche
Graphidostreptus
Guanabarastreptus
Guanabarostreptus
Guaporeptus
Guviogonus
Guyanostreptus
Gymnostreptus
Haplogonopus
Helicogonus
Helicosolenus
Hemigymnostreptus
Heteropyge
Heterostreptus
Humilistreptus
Involverostreptus
Ischiotrichus
Isophyllostreptus
Isoporostreptus
Kartinikus
Kochliogonopus
Kochliogonus
Krugerostreptus
Lobogonus
Lophogonus
Lophostreptus
Mardonius
Mayastreptus
Megagymnostreptus
Megaskamma
Metagonocoelius
Metriostreptus
Microtrullius
Minasgonus
Myostreptus
Nanostreptus
Nesostreptus
Obelostreptus
Odontostreptus
Onychostreptus
Ophistreptoides
Ophistreptus
Oreastreptus
Orthogoneptus
Orthoporoides
Orthoporus
Paulistostreptus
Pemptoporus
Perizonopus
Perustreptus
Phallorthus
Plagiotaphrus
Plusioporus
Porostreptus
Pseudogymnostreptus
Pseudotibiozus
Ptenogonostreptus
Ptilostreptus
Rhamphostreptus
Rhapidostreptus
Rhodesiostreptus
Rondostreptus
Rubanostreptus
Rutabulogonus
Sagmatostreptus
Scaphiostreptus
Skytostreptus
Sooretama
Sphaeromerus
Spirocyclistus
Spiropoeus
Spirostreptus
Stenostreptus
Streptolus
Synophryostreptus
Telodeinopus
Telomicropus
Termatodiscus
Tibiozus
Tomogonus
Torynopus
Trachystreptus
Triaenostreptus
Trichogonostreptus
Tropitrachelus
Tubostreptus
Urostreptus
Urotropis
Venezueneptus
Vilcastreptus
Zantekius

References

Spirostreptida
Millipede families